Fintan Ryan (born 24 September 1996) is an Irish track and road cyclist, who currently rides for UCI Continental team . Representing Ireland at international competitions, Ryan competed at the 2015 UEC European Track Championships in the team pursuit event and at the 2016 UEC European Track Championships in the elimination race event. He was also 2013 national junior road race champion of Ireland, and raced for Nicolas Roche's development team.

References

External links

1996 births
Living people
Irish male cyclists
Irish track cyclists
Place of birth missing (living people)
Cyclists at the 2019 European Games
European Games competitors for Ireland
People from Wicklow (town)